Salap High School is the oldest secondary school in Ullahpara Upazila, Sirajganj District, Bangladesh. It was established in 1905 by the zamindar of Sannyal Salap.

References

External links
 

High schools in Bangladesh
1905 establishments in India
Educational institutions established in 1905